The Indonesian Democratic Party of Struggle (PDI-P) is an marhaen populist Indonesian political party, and the party of the current President of Indonesia, Joko Widodo. It is a member of the Council of Asian Liberals and Democrats and Progressive Alliance.

The PDI-P was founded and is currently led by Megawati Sukarnoputri, president of Indonesia from 2001 to 2004, and daughter of Sukarno, the first president of Indonesia. Megawati was forced out from the leadership of the Indonesian Democratic Party (PDI) by the government of Indonesia under Suharto in 1996. Megawati formed the PDI-P in 1999, after Suharto resigned and restrictions on political parties were lifted.

Origins

At the 1993 National Congress, Megawati Sukarnoputri was elected Chairperson of the Indonesian Democratic Party, one of the three political parties recognised by President Suharto's "New Order" government. This result was not recognised by the government, which continued to push for Budi Harjono, its preferred candidate for the chairpersonship, to be elected. A Special Congress was held where the government expected to have Harjono elected, but Megawati once again emerged as elected leader. Her position was consolidated further when a PDI National Assembly ratified the results of the congress.

In June 1996, another National Congress was held in the city of Medan, to which Megawati was not invited; anti-Megawati members were in attendance. With the government's backing, Suryadi, a former chairperson was re-elected as PDI's Chairperson. Megawati refused to acknowledge the results of this congress and continued to see herself as the rightful leader of the PDI.

On the morning of 27 July 1996, Suryadi threatened to take back PDI's headquarters in Jakarta. Suryadi's supporters (reportedly with the Government's backing) attacked the PDI Headquarters and faced resistance from Megawati supporters who had been stationed there since the National Congress in Medan. In the ensuing clash, Megawati's supporters managed to hold on to the headquarters. A riot ensued – at that stage considered the worst that Jakarta had seen during the "New Order" – which was followed by a government crackdown. The government later blamed the riots on the People's Democracy Party (PRD). Despite being overthrown as chairperson by Suryadi and the government, the event lifted Megawati's profile immensely, providing both sympathy and national popularity.

The PDI was now divided into two factions, Megawati's and Suryadi's. The former had wanted to participate in the 1997 legislative elections, but the government only recognized the latter. In the elections, Megawati and her supporters threw their support behind the United Development Party and the PDI won only 3% of the vote. Following Suharto's resignation and the lifting of the "New Order" limitations on national political parties, Megawati declared the formation of the PDI-P, adding the suffix perjuangan ("struggle") to differentiate her faction of the party from the government-backed faction. She was elected chairperson of PDI-P and was nominated for the presidency in 1999.

History

1999 legislative elections and MPR General Session
PDI-P was by far the most popular political party coming into the 1999 legislative elections. With 33% of the votes, PDI-P emerged with the largest share. As the 1999 People's Consultative Assembly (MPR) General Session loomed closer, it was expected that PDI-P would once again play the dominant role. Despite winning the legislative elections, PDI-P did not have absolute majority. Despite this however, PDI-P never formed a coalition with any of the other political parties in the lead up to the 1999 MPR General Session. The closest PDI-P had to a coalition was a loose alliance with Abdurrahman Wahid's National Awakening Party (PKB).

The presidency looked set to be contested by Megawati and the then incumbent BJ Habibie of Golkar who was looking for a second term. However, MPR Chairman Amien Rais had other ideas as he formed a coalition called the Central Axis which consisted of Muslim Parties. Amien also announced that he would like to nominate Wahid as president. PKB, their alliance with PDI-P never cemented, now moved over to the Central Axis. Golkar then joined this coalition after Habibie's accountability speech was rejected and he withdrew from the race. It came down to Megawati and Wahid. Wahid, with a powerful coalition backing him was elected as Indonesia's 4th president with 373 votes to Megawati's 313. The PDI-P supporters were outraged. As the winners of the legislative elections, they expected to win the presidential elections also. PDI-P masses began rioting in cities such as Jakarta, Solo and Medan. The normally peaceful Bali was also involved in pro-Megawati protests. Wahid then realized that there was a need to recognize PDI-P's status as the winners of the Legislative Elections. With that, he encouraged Megawati to run for the vice presidency.

Megawati rejected this offer when she saw that she had to face opponents such as United Development Party's (PPP) Hamzah Haz and Golkar's Akbar Tanjung and Wiranto. After some politicking by Wahid, Akbar and Wiranto withdrew from the race. Wahid also ordered PKB to throw their weight behind Megawati. She was now confident and competed in the vice presidential elections, and was elected with 396 votes to Hamzah's 284.

2000 party congress, Wahid's presidency and splits
The First PDI-P Congress was held in Semarang, Central Java in April 2000, during which Megawati was re-elected as the chairperson of PDI-P for a second term. The congress was noted as one where she consolidated her position within PDI-P by taking harsh measures to remove potential rivals. During the election for the chairperson, two other candidates emerged, Eros Djarot and Dimyati Hartono. Both ran because they did not want Megawati to hold the PDI-P chairpersonship while concurrently being Vice President.

For Eros, when finally received his nomination from the South Jakarta branch, membership problems arose and made his nomination void. He was then not allowed to go and participate in the congress. Disillusioned with what he perceived to be a cult of personality developing around Megawati, Eros left PDI-P and in July 2002, formed the Freedom Bull National Party. For Dimyati, although his candidacy was not opposed as harshly as Eros', he was removed from his position as Head of PDI-P's Central Branch. He kept his position as a People's Representative Council (DPR) member but retired in February 2002. In April 2002, Dimyati formed the Our Homeland of Indonesia Party (PITA).

Although it had not supported Wahid for presidency, PDI-P members received ministerial positions in his cabinet because of Megawati's position as vice president. As time went on, much like the Central Axis that had supported Wahid, PDI-P would grow disillusioned with him. In April 2000, Laksamana Sukardi, a PDI-P member who held position as Minister of Investments and State Owned Enterprises was sacked from his position. When PDI-P enquired as to why this was done, Wahid claimed it was because of corruption but never backed up his claim.

The relationship improved somewhat when later in the year, when Wahid authorized Megawati to manage the day-to-day running of the government. However, she and PDI-P had slowly but surely started to distance themselves from Wahid and join forces with the Central Axis. Finally, in July 2001 at a Special Session of the MPR, Wahid was removed as president. Megawati was then elected as president to replace him with Hamzah as her vice president, becoming Indonesia's first female president. They party, however, faced further splits after Megawati became president with more disillusioned members leaving the party. Two of them were Megawati's own sisters. In May 2002, Sukmawati Sukarnoputri formed the Indonesian National Party Marhaenism (PNI-Marhaenisme). This was followed in November 2002, with Rachmawati Sukarnoputri declaring the formation of the Pioneers' Party (PP).

2004 elections
By 2004, the reformist sentiments that had led PDI-P to victory in the 1999 elections had died down. Many were disappointed with what the reform process had achieved thus far and were also disappointed with Megawati's presidency. This was reflected in the 2004 legislative election, PDI-P obtained 18.5% of the total vote, down from the 33.7% it obtained in 1999.

PDI-P nominated Megawati as its presidential candidate for the 2004 presidential election. Several running mates were considered, including Hamzah Haz (to renew the partnership), Susilo Bambang Yudhoyono (SBY), and Jusuf Kalla. Megawati eventually selected Nahdatul Ulama chairman Hasyim Muzadi as her running mate. It was expected that she would appeal to nationalist sentiments while Hasyim would appeal to Islamist voters. In the first round of elections, the pairing came second to SBY/Kalla. To improve their chances in the run-off, the PDI-P formed a coalition with the PPP, Golkar, the Reform Star Party (PBR) and the Prosperous Peace Party (PDS) in August 2004. However, they were defeated in the run-off against SBY/Kalla. The National Coalition then turned their eyes on being the opposition in the DPR for the SBY/Kalla government. With Kalla's election as chairman of Golkar, Golkar defected to the government's side, leaving the PDI-P as the only major opposition party in the DPR.

2005 party congress
On 28 March 2005, the second PDI-P Congress was held in Sanur, Bali where Megawati was re-elected to the chairpersonship for a third term. Her brother, Guruh Sukarnoputra, was chosen as head of the party's Education and Culture department. This congress was noted for the formation of a faction called the Renewal of PDI-P Movement. It called for a renewal of the party leadership if it was to win the 2009 legislative elections. Although they attended the Congress, the members left once Megawati was re-elected. In December 2005, these same members would form the Democratic Renewal Party (PDP).

2009 elections
The party came third in the 2009 legislative election with 14% of the votes. It had 95 seats in the DPR. Megawati was chosen as the presidential candidate, this time with a coalition between the Great Indonesia Movement Party and PDI-P themselves, with Prabowo Subianto as her running mate. They lost to SBY, with Boediono as vice-president, who won 26.6% of the vote.

2014 elections
In March 2014, the party nominated Jakarta governor Joko Widodo as its presidential candidate, with Jusuf Kalla as his running mate. The pairing won with 53.15% of the vote, and PDI-P returned as the largest party in the DPR, winning nearly 19% of the vote.

2019 elections
In April 2019, incumbent president Joko Widodo was the party's presidential candidate running for a second term, with Ma'ruf Amin as his running mate. Widodo won successful won a second term with 55.50% of the vote. PDI-P remained the largest party in the DPR, winning 19.33% of the vote.

"Banteng versus Celeng" Faction Rivalry 
Amidst preparation to compete in the 2024 Indonesian general election, the party experienced a split into two factions. Younger PDI-P generation cadres expressed their distaste for Puan Maharani (the preferred candidate by older generation cadres of the party). They favoured Ganjar Pranowo, who, despite being popular, asserted that he doesn't intend to be a presidential candidate. On 9 October 2021, Bambang Wuryanto, Chief of PDI-P Central Java Regional Branch, delivered an adage that party cadres, officials, and officers must follow one command from the higher command, the "Banteng" (Javanese of "Bulls") command, which supported Maharani. For those who do not support her, he called them "Celeng" (Javanese of "Wild Boars"). In response to Wuryanto's adage, young PDI-P cadres reacted strongly over it and launched Barisan Celeng Berjuang (English: Movement of Struggling Boars) campaign on 12 October 2021 against Wuryanto and the central leadership of PDI-P, who they believe are unrealistic for pushing Maharani as a candidate. The movement also launched a flag, which satirized the PDI-P flag and has an inverted colour scheme (Black Bull in Red Flag for PDI-P, and Red Boar in Black Flag for Barisan Celeng Berjuang), as a sign of defiance against the central command of PDI-P.

As the result of the faction rivalry, on 15 October 2021, all involved cadres from both sides are sanctioned by the PDI-P central committee for attempting to bypass the party's central leadership decision-making process. The central committee reasserted that the decision on establishing the presidential candidate vested on Megawati only. The central committee also asked the cadres to cease the rivalry.

Party policies and program
According to its website, the party aims to realize the aims contained in the preamble to the 1945 Constitution in the form of a just and prosperous society and to bring about an Indonesia that is socially just as well as politically sovereign and economically self-sufficient, and that is Indonesian in character and culture.

At the party's fourth congress in 2015, the PDIP issued a seven-point statement entitled "Realizing Great Indonesia, an Indonesia that is Truly Independent", in which it committed itself to oversee the program of the central government and ensuring it keeps its campaign promises while reinforcing its position as a political force and underlining its support for the poor and battling structural poverty.

Chairperson
 Megawati Sukarnoputri (1999–present)

Election results

Legislative election results

Presidential election results

Note: Bold text indicates party member

References

External links 
 1999 Legislative Elections Profile

1998 establishments in Indonesia
Centre-left parties in Asia
Left-wing nationalist parties
Left-wing populism
Liberal and progressive movements within Islam
Liberal parties in Indonesia
Nationalist parties in Asia
Pancasila political parties
Political parties established in 1998
Political parties in Indonesia
Progressive Alliance
Social liberal parties
Socialist parties in Indonesia